Sesfontein is a settlement in the Kunene Region of Namibia, situated  from the regional capital Opuwo. It is the district capital of Sesfontein Constituency, its population is 7,358. Sesfontein derives its name from the six fountains which have their source in the vicinity. The settlement features a clinic.

The most well known landmark of Sesfontein is Fort Sesfontein, erected in 1896 as a police outpost by Schutztruppe soldiers of Imperial Germany. It was abandoned in 1914 and fell into disrepair soon thereafter. Considered a prospective National Monument in 1984 it was decided in 1989 not to list it. The fort was reconstructed in the 1990s and is now equipped to accommodate tourists. The palm trees at the fort were planted by the German police officers who manned the fort to combat weapons smuggling and elephant and rhino poaching.

References

Populated places in the Kunene Region